Hemphill is an unincorporated community on the Tug Fork River in McDowell County, West Virginia, United States. It lies between Capels and Welch.

References

Unincorporated communities in McDowell County, West Virginia
Unincorporated communities in West Virginia
Coal towns in West Virginia